Recettes générales, commonly known as généralités, were the administrative divisions of France under the Ancien Régime and are often considered to prefigure the current préfectures. At the time of the French Revolution, there were thirty-six généralités.

Among the multiple divisions utilised for various purposes by the kings' administrators, généralités emerged gradually from the 14th to the 16th centuries.  Initially fiscal, their role steadily increased to become by the late 17th century — under the authority of an intendant (reporting to the Controller-General of Finances) — the very framework of royal administration and centralisation.

History
Before the 14th century, oversight of the collection of royal taxes fell generally to the baillis and sénéchaux in their circumscriptions.  Reforms in the 14th and 15th centuries saw France's royal financial administration run by two financial boards which worked in a collegial manner: the four généraux des finances (also called général conseiller or receveur général ) oversaw the collection of taxes (taille, aides, gabelle, etc.) and the four trésoriers de France (treasurers) oversaw revenues from royal lands (the domaine royal). Together they were often referred to as messieurs des finances. The four members of each board were divided by geographical circumscriptions (although the term généralité is not found before the end of the 15th century); the areas were named Languedoïl (center and southwest of the country), Languedoc (Languedoc, Lyonnais, Forez, Beaujolais), Outre-Seine-et-Yonne (Île-de-France, Champagne), and Normandy (the latter was created in 1449; the other three were created earlier), with the directors of the Languedoïl region typically having an honorific preeminence. By 1484, the number of généralités had increased to six.

In the 16th century, the kings of France, in an effort to exert a more direct control over royal finances and to circumvent the double-board (accused of poor oversight), instituted numerous administrative reforms, including the restructuring of the financial administration and an increase in the number of généralités. On December 7, 1542, by edict of Francis I, France was divided into sixteen généralités.  The number increased to twenty-one at the end of the 16th century, and to thirty-six by the time of the French Revolution. The last two were created in 1784.

The administration of the généralités of the early modern period went through a variety of reforms. In 1577 Henry III established five treasurers (trésoriers généraux) in each généralité who would form a bureau of finances. In the 17th century, oversight of the généralités was subsumed by the "intendants of finance, justice and police", and the expression généralité and intendance became roughly synonymous.

List of généralités-intendants

See also
Ancien Régime in France
Provinces of France
Taille

References
 

Taxation in France
Subdivisions of France
Economic history of the Ancien Régime

de:Historische Provinzen Frankreichs#Liste der Généralités